This is a list of power stations located in Bulgaria. The list may be incomplete.

Nuclear 
Total current capacity: 2,000 MW

Hydro 
Total current capacity: >2,600 MW

Thermal 
Total current capacity: >7,200 MW

Solar 
 Total current capacity: 61 MW
 Karadzhalovo Solar Park - 60.4 MW, currently the largest in the Balkan region
 Paunovo - 1 MW
 Tervel / General Toshevo - 60 kW, planned
 Tervel - 5 MW, planned

Wind 
 Total current capacity: 456,2 MW

 Buzludzha - 50 MW, currently in testing, to be fully operational before 2011
 St. Nikola Wind Farm - Kavarna - 156 MW (52 turbines)
 Wind Farm Acorn Energy - Hrabrovo - 6 MW (3 turbines)
 Suvororo Wind Farm - Suvorovo - 60 MW (30 turbines)
  Balchik Wind Farm - Balchik  - 10 MW (5 turbines)
  Kaliakra WPP - Kaliakra  - 35 MW (35 turbines)
 Mogilishte-Zapad - Mogilishte - 17,6 MW (10 turbines)
  Vertocom Wind Farm - Kazanlak - 72,5 MW (29 turbines)
  Vranino Wind Farm - Dobrich - 18 MW (9 turbines)
  Karapelit Wind Farm - Dobrich - 12 MW (6 turbines)
  Krupen Wind Farm - Dobrich - 12 MW (4 turbines)
  Kardam Wind Farm - Dobrich - 12,6 MW (4 turbines)
  Shabla Wind Farm - Dobrich - 42 MW (14 turbines)
 Somovit wind turbine - 2.5 MW, single turbine

See also 

 Energy in Bulgaria

Notes 

 
Bulgaria
Power stations